The 1914 Colorado Mines Orediggers football team represented the Colorado School of Mines in the 1914 college football season. The team won the Rocky Mountain Conference.

Schedule

References

Colorado Mines
Colorado Mines Orediggers football seasons
Rocky Mountain Athletic Conference football champion seasons
College football undefeated seasons
Colorado Mines Orediggers football